Iraq, is a village in the Ludhiana district of Punjab, India. It is located in the Machhiwara block, around 30 km from the Ludhiana city.

History 

The village gets its name from "Irakh", the Arabic word for a wild bull breed. The animal was used by the Muslim villagers to cross a seasonal stream on the outskirts of the village. Over time, the pronunciation of the village's name gradually changed to "Iraq". The Muslim villagers migrated to Sialkot after the partition of India in 1947.

Demographics 

As of 2014, the village has around 800 inhabitants. Most of the villagers work as farmers or as workers in the spinning mills located around the Machiwara-Ludhiana Road.

References 

  
Villages in Ludhiana district